On the Wing may refer to:

 On the Wing (film), a 1986 IMAX film
 On the Wings, an album released by Socrates Drank The Conium
 "On the Wing", a song from the album Ocean Eyes by Owl City

See also
 "Pigs on the Wing", a song by Pink Floyd
 On the Wings of Love (disambiguation)